is a public park in Toshima, Tokyo, Japan. A cafe called RACINE FARM TO PARK is also on the premises.

History
The park was originally created in 1948 through a land readjustment project. From 14 September 2009 to 2014 it was closed due to the construction of an underground substation of Tokyo Electric Power Company and park maintenance construction. It was fully reopened on Saturday, April 2, 2016.

What the park used to look like
In addition to the general public, there were many homeless people using the park. For the homeless people and those who attended public employment security office, soup kitchens and social welfare activities were conducted by volunteer groups and the government.

Access
 By train: 6 minutes’ walk from Ikebukuro Station.

See also
 Parks and gardens in Tokyo
 National Parks of Japan

References

 Website of Toshima City (in Japanese)
https://www.realpublicestate.jp/post/minamiikebukuro-park
https://www.jstage.jst.go.jp/article/journalcpij/53/3/53_341/_pdf/-char/ja

External links
 Website of LANDSCAPE PLUS LTD. (in Japanese)
Parks and gardens in Tokyo